The 86 class is a class of electric locomotives built by Comeng, Granville for the State Rail Authority of New South Wales.

History
The 86 class initially hauled passenger and freight services to Lithgow on the Main Western line and Wyong on the Main Northern line. Their sphere of operation extended to Newcastle on the latter line in June 1984 and to Port Kembla in January 1986 when the Illawarra line was electrified.

With a one-hour rating of 4,400 horsepower (hp), the 86 class was the most powerful locomotive in Australia at the time. Although no longer in regular use, the class remains among the most powerful in the country. Despite their higher power rating, they were generally regarded as inferior to the Metropolitan-Vickers built 46 class, which dated from the late 1950s.

The last, 8650 was delivered as a Bo-Bo-Bo trial unit. It spent long periods out of traffic undergoing repair.

In 1994/95 all were repainted by A Goninan & Co, Taree into FreightCorp blue. By October 1997 18 had been withdrawn from service with cracked frames. By this stage the amount of work requiring electrics was reducing. National Rail decided it would through haul its services and from March 1998 FreightCorp ceased operating them on Main Northern line services. The need for electrics continued to decline with their remaining duties mainly being hauling coal trains from Lithgow to Port Kembla. The last examples were withdrawn in June 2002.

In 2002, most were sold to Silverton Rail and taken to Broken Hill then sold again in February 2006 to Allco Finance Group with some on sold, but most scrapped. Four were leased back to RailCorp in 2004 (8601, 8609, 8622 and 8644) for use on infrastructure trains during construction of the Bondi Junction turnback.

Survivors

References

Further reading

External links

Bo-Bo-Bo locomotives
Co-Co locomotives
Commonwealth Engineering locomotives
Electric locomotives of New South Wales
Railway locomotives introduced in 1983
Standard gauge locomotives of Australia
1500 V DC locomotives